Alishan station is a railway station on the Forestry Bureau Alishan Forest Railway line located in Alishan township, Chiayi County, Taiwan.

History
The station was opened on 11 January 1981. The station was badly damaged due to the 921 earthquake on 21 September 1999. It was then rebuilt on the same spot and reopened in 2007.

Architecture
The station building is made by wood with the line of arched wooden pillars. The station has also spacious viewing platform outside the building.

See also
 List of railway stations in Taiwan

References

1981 establishments in Taiwan
Alishan Forest Railway stations
Railway stations in Chiayi County
Railway stations opened in 1981